John Cooper (11 July 1922 – 19 November 2012) was an Australian cricketer. He played in one first-class match for Queensland in 1956/57.

See also
 List of Queensland first-class cricketers

References

External links
 

1922 births
2012 deaths
Australian cricketers
Queensland cricketers
Cricketers from Melbourne
People from Lilydale, Victoria